Espadrilles (Spanish: alpargatas or esparteñas; Catalan: espardenyes; Basque: espartinak) are casual, rope-soled, flat but sometimes high-heeled shoes. They usually have a canvas or cotton fabric upper and a flexible sole made of esparto rope. The esparto rope sole is the defining characteristic of an espadrille; the uppers vary widely in style.

Espadrilles are a typical form of summer footwear, with strong historical ties to the regions of Catalonia, Aragon, and the Basque Country. The word derives from the Catalan "espardenya" and refers to esparto grass, a plant indigenous to the south of Spain that is used to make ropes and basketry. Although they are still widely manufactured in Spain, some production has moved to Bangladesh, the world's largest jute producer. 

Originally peasant footwear, they were popularised throughout the 20th century by many cultural figures including Picasso, Salvador Dalí and later John F. Kennedy and Yves Saint Laurent.

Etymology

The existence of this kind of shoe in Europe is documented since at least 1322, when it was described for the first time with its current Catalan name. 
The term espadrille is French and derives from the word in the Occitan language, which comes from espardenya in Catalan or alpargata and esparteña in Spanish. Both espardenya and esparteña refer to a type of shoes made with esparto, a tough, wiry Mediterranean grass used in making rope. Its name in the Basque region is espartina.

History 

Espadrilles have been made in the Basque Country, Catalonia and roughly all over Spain as well as the Occitania region of France. They were the usual peasant footwear since the 14th century at least, and are still being produced as from old. The oldest, most primitive form of espadrilles dates as far back as 4,000 years ago. Traditional espadrilles have a canvas upper with the toe and vamp cut in one piece and seamed to the rope sole at the sides. Often they have laces at the throat that are wrapped around the ankle to hold the shoes securely in place. Traditional espadrilles are worn by both men and women.

Use in Argentina 
Both in Argentina and Uruguay, espadrilles (known as alpargatas) were adopted by rural workers as a substitute for the "bota de potro", part of the traditional gaucho attire, made with leather from the lower leg of the horse. Unlike other clothing, the espadrille became an essential garment for both sexes but, above all, the inseparable companion of the bombachas (knickerbockers). In the first half of the 20th century, the use of espadrilles was so common among the lower classes of the population that the company called Fábrica Argentina de Alpargatas took great importance, which used to be promoted with the artistic almanacs illustrated by Florencio Molina Campos. Espadrilles entered the Argentine political scene  prior to the presidency of Juan Domingo Perón by associating it with the working class. In 1943 and 1944, the student movement opposed to Perón began to use the slogan: "No a la dictadura de las alpargatas" ("Not espadrilles' dictatorship") which was in turn responded by the peronists: "alpargatas sí, libros, no" ("espadrilles, yes, books, not").

Modern espadrilles
Once peasant footwear, then urban workers' footwear, espadrilles have grown in popularity, especially in the French Atlantic coast of the Basque Country and Spanish Mediterranean coast from Granada to Girona, where many men and women wear them during the spring and summer months. Designer espadrilles are now widely available. They are usually manufactured in Spain, France, and South Asia. Modern espadrilles are predominantly for women, though some men's shoes are made in this style.

The soles of espadrilles may be flat, platform, or wedge shaped made of natural fiber.  Uppers may be made from nearly any substance and may have open or closed toes, open or closed backs, and can be slip-on or tied to the ankle with laces.  Thousands of varieties of espadrilles can be found, from inexpensive bargain brands to high priced designer brands.

Espadrilles became fashionable in the United States in the 1940s. Lauren Bacall's character in the 1948 movie Key Largo wore ankle-laced espadrilles.

Wedge-shaped espadrilles were first popularized by French fashion designer Yves Saint Laurent. At a trade fair in Paris in 1970, he came into contact with the Spanish espadrille manufacturer Castañer. Yves Saint Laurent had been looking in vain for months for someone to make him a wedge espadrille. Castañer managed to interpret Yves Saint Laurent's vision and the wedge espadrilles were an instant hit, influencing fashion even today.

The espadrille style was revived in the United States in the 1980s, due to the success of Miami Vice—the shoe was worn by the character Sonny Crockett (played by Don Johnson).  In 2013 at luxury shoe stores in New York City, a pair of espadrilles could cost nearly $500.

Jute sole espadrilles
Due to cost and material availability, the soles of espadrilles are now commonly made with jute rope or braid. The natural bright white color of jute is a major design feature of modern espadrilles.

Bangladesh is the producer of high quality jute and has become a manufacturing center for premium quality jute soles and complete espadrilles. Ninety percent of the world's total production of complete espadrilles, as well as jute soles, is now manufactured in Bangladesh,  although some manufacturers in Spain, France, and Italy import jute soles from Bangladesh to finish espadrilles in those countries.  Complete espadrilles are also assembled in Argentina, Bolivia, Chile, Colombia, Paraguay and Venezuela with imported jute from Bangladesh.

Jute soles typically include fully or partially vulcanized rubber beneath the jute soles for long-lasting espadrille shoes.  Sometimes crepe soles are used as out-soles although those are not as durable compared to vulcanized ones.  Jute braid soles might include heels made of wood or EVA foam.

Manufacture

The manufacture of espadrilles is generally more complex than that of sandals. The jute soles are the most critical part.  The jute twines are first machine-braided. These braids are then manually formed into the shape of the sole and  hydraulically pressed with heat to form the final shape and completed with vertical stitching with Espadrille Needles. These basic soles are then vulcanized underneath.  EVA foam or wooden heels are glued in place and more jute braids are wrapped around it to complete the soles. Uppers of different styles are then built on the jute soles to complete the espadrille.

See also
 Bast shoes, similar footwear in Balto-Slavic cultures of identical etymological derivation (from fibre used in their manufacture)
 Waraji, Japanese version

References

Shoes
Sandals
Folk footwear
Jute
Articles containing video clips